The 35th General Assembly of Nova Scotia represented Nova Scotia between 1911 and 1916.

The Liberal Party led by George Henry Murray formed the government.

James F. Ellis was named speaker in 1912.

The assembly was dissolved on May 22, 1916.

List of Members 

Notes:

References 
 

Terms of the General Assembly of Nova Scotia
1911 establishments in Nova Scotia
1916 disestablishments in Nova Scotia
20th century in Nova Scotia